Anice Wismer Johnson (February 22, 1919 – January 22, 1992) is a former member of the Ohio Senate. She represented the 18th District, which encompassed much of Northeastern Ohio. She served from 1973 to 1975. Prior to this, she was a member of the Ohio House of Representatives.

External links
Profile on the Ohio Ladies Gallery website

References

Republican Party Ohio state senators
Politicians from Cleveland
Women state legislators in Ohio
1919 births
1992 deaths
20th-century American politicians
20th-century American women politicians